Haddad Alwi Assegaff (born March 13, 1966 in Jakarta, Indonesia) is an Indonesian nasheed singer and actor. His first album, Cinta Rasul 1 (1999) is the best-selling nasheed album in Indonesia.

Discography

Album
 1999: Cinta Rasul
 Cinta Rasul 2
 Cinta Rasul 3
 Cinta Rasul 4
 Cinta Rasul 5
 Cinta Rasul 6
 Cinta Rasul 7
 Jalan Cinta
 Jalan Cinta 2

References

External links
Cinta Rasul official site

1966 births
Arabic-language singers
20th-century Indonesian male singers
Living people
21st-century Indonesian male singers
Singers from Jakarta
Indonesian Muslims
Anugerah Musik Indonesia winners
Indonesian male film actors
Indonesian male television actors